Six Mile Township is one of twelve townships in Franklin County, Illinois, USA.  As of the 2010 census, its population was 3,885 and it contained 1,741 housing units.

Geography

Cities, towns, villages
 Royalton
 Zeigler

Unincorporated towns
 Cleburne
 Mitchell
 New Bush
(This list is based on USGS data and may include former settlements.)

Cemeteries
The township contains these fourteen cemeteries: Browning, Butler, Dawson, Miners (Old), Miners (New), Moyers, Osage, Saint Aloysius, Saint Andrews, Saint Marys, Vaughn, Wells, Zeigler (Old), and Zeigler (New).

Major highways
  Illinois Route 148
  Illinois Route 149
  Illinois Route 184

Airports and landing strips
 Adams Airport

Lakes
 B And A Lake
 Hilyn Lake

Demographics

School districts
 Zeigler-Royalton Community Unit School District 188

Political districts
 Illinois' 12th congressional district
 State House District 117
 State Senate District 59

References
 
 United States Census Bureau 2007 TIGER/Line Shapefiles
 United States National Atlas

External links
 City-Data.com
 Illinois State Archives

Townships in Franklin County, Illinois
Townships in Illinois